The Swarm is a       German/European Alliance co-produced science fiction television series directed by Barbara Eder, Luke Watson and Philipp Stölzl. Adapted from the eponymous novel by Frank Schätzing, the series depicts the struggle of humankind against an unknown swarm intelligence that lives in the depths of the sea.

The Swarm is available for streaming on ZDF from 1 March, it will also be available on RAI, France Télévisions, Viaplay, Movistar, ORF, SRF and Hulu Japan from March.

Cast

 Cécile de France as Dr. Cécile Roche
 Alexander Karim as Dr. Sigur Johanson
 Leonie Benesch as Charlie Wagner
 Joshua Odjick as Leon Anawak
 Takuya Kimura as Aito Mifune
 Krista Kosonen as Tina Lund
 Rosabell Laurenti Sellers as Alicia  Delaware
 Barbara Sukowa as Prof. Katharina Lehmann
 Oliver Masucci as Captain Jasper Alban
 Sharon Duncan-Brewster as Samantha Crowe
 Claudia Jurt as Dr. Natalia Oliviera
 Kari Corbett as Iona
 Jack Greenlees as Douglas MacKinnon
 Lydia Wilson as Sara Thompson
 Takehiro Hira as Riku Sato
 Klaas Heufer-Umlauf as Luther Roscovitz 
 Eidin Jalali as Rahim Amir  
 Franziska Weisz as Sophia Granelli  
 Andrea Guo as Jess
 David Vormweg as Tomas
 Dutch Johnson as Jack Greywolf O'Bannon

Production

Frank Doelger announced in 2020 at Cannes, as part of the International Market for Television Programs (MIPTV), that his next TV series The Swarm was going to be the adaptation of novel The Swarm by Frank Schätzing. The series was produced by ZDF within the framework set by the European Alliance, with France Télévisions and RAI, and in co-production with ORF, SRF, Viaplay Group and Hulu Japan who formed the joint venture 'Schwarm TV Productions GmbH & Co KG'. The series is the first project from Doelger-led Intaglio Films, a joint venture formed in 2019 by the German production company Beta Film and ZDF Enterprises.

The international cast is selected by casting director Robert Sterne, and includes European actors, Cécile de France, Sharon Duncan-Brewster, Jack Greenlees, Lydia Wilson, Krista Kosonen, Alexander Karim, Leonie Benesch and German star Barbara Sukowa with Japanese actors Takuya Kimura and Takehiro Hira. American actors Rosabell Laurenti Sellers and Dutch Johnson, and Canadian Joshua Odjick also feature in the series.

The script was written by Steven Lally, Marissa Lestrade, Chris Lunt and Michael A. Walker in consultation with  experts, such as polar and deep-sea researcher Professor Antje Boetius, from the Alfred Wegener Institute, and Dr Jon Copley, professor of Ocean Exploration from the University of Southampton. Barbara Eder, Luke Watson and Philipp Stölzl directed the series.

Filming began on 7 June 2021 in Italy and Belgium. The final scenes of the series were filmed at a  underwater studio on the outskirts of Brussels.

Episodes

Season 1

Season 2
In an interview, Barbara Eder confirmed that there are already ideas for a second season, but their implementation still has to be decided after the figures for the first season have been evaluated.

Reception
Mike McCahill reviewing for Variety wrote that the series is reassuringly straightforward and familiar.  McCahill opined, "Its briny pulp – dredged from Frank Schätzing’s 2004 novel, preys heavily on viewer fears of ecological collapse, and what might be lurking for us all beneath the planet’s watery depths".

The series featured in the list of six international dramas to watch in 2023, published by Deadline Hollywood.
Oliver Armknecht reviewing for film-rezensionen.de graded the series 5 out of 10, criticised the visuals and opined that there was not much to do for the ensemble. In conclusion  Armknecht wrote, "The global threat can only be felt in a few places, If you don't know the story, you may be surprised at the strange occurrences, at least at first - especially since some maritime attacks are really perfidious."

References

External links
 
 The Swarm at Berlinale
 The Swarm at Cineuropa
 The Swarm at ZDF in 
 

2023 German television series debuts
German-language television shows
English-language television shows
Television series based on books
ZDF original programming
German science fiction television series